The Long Plain Friends Meetinghouse is a historic Quaker meeting house at 1341 N. Main Street in Acushnet, Massachusetts.  It is a two-story wood-frame structure, with a gable roof and two chimneys.  A single-story hip-roof vestibule projects from the front, with a pair of entrances flanking a window.  Built in 1759, it is the oldest ecclesiastical building to survive in southeastern Massachusetts.  It was listed on the National Register of Historic Places in 1986.

The building served as Quaker meeting house until 1985, when it was taken over by the Long Plain Museum.  It is open for tours on weekends, and features original artifacts, pews from three centuries, and a small museum with exhibits about Quakers.

See also
National Register of Historic Places listings in Bristol County, Massachusetts

References

History of Bristol County, Massachusetts
Quaker meeting houses in Massachusetts
Religious buildings and structures completed in 1759
Churches on the National Register of Historic Places in Massachusetts
Religious museums in Massachusetts
Museums in Bristol County, Massachusetts
Churches in Bristol County, Massachusetts
Acushnet, Massachusetts
18th-century Quaker meeting houses
National Register of Historic Places in Bristol County, Massachusetts